Nogmung; sometimes Naung Mung or Naun Mong and combinations) is a town in northern Myanmar's Kachin State with about 1000 inhabitants as of 2006. It is the last town encountered when hiking northwards to Hkakaborazi National Park and the highest peak of Myanmar, Mt. Hkakabo Razi. Nogmung is also the gateway for Tahaundam, the northernmost village of Myanmar. Nogmung is famous for its bird diversity, and many endemic species are postulated to exist there.

In 2005, the Naung Mung scimitar babbler (Jabouilleia naungmungensis) was described based on a specimen collected near Nogmung. The Smithsonian's National Zoo and the Hkakabo Razi National Park Authorities have surveyed the avifauna since 2001 in Putao, Nogmung, and northwards to Tahaundam.

References

External links
Satellite map at Maplandia.com

Township capitals of Myanmar
Populated places in Kachin State